The Jacques Cartier Strait (French: Détroit de Jacques-Cartier) is a strait in eastern Quebec, Canada, flowing between Anticosti Island and the Labrador Peninsula. It is one of the two outlets of the Saint Lawrence River into its estuary, the Gulf of Saint Lawrence. The other is the Honguedo Strait on the south side of Anticosti Island.

Jacques Cartier Strait was officially named for the French explorer Jacques Cartier in 1934 by the Geographic Board of Quebec to commemorate the 400th anniversary of his arrival in North America. Prior to this, it was also known as Détroit Saint-Pierre (by Cartier himself on August 1, 1534, the day of St. Peter), Labrador Channel (until 1815), and Mingan Passage.

References 

Straits of Quebec
Landforms of Côte-Nord